The posterior triangle (or lateral cervical region) is a region of the neck.

Boundaries
The posterior triangle has the following boundaries:

Apex: Union of the sternocleidomastoid and the trapezius muscles at the superior nuchal line of the occipital bone

Anteriorly: Posterior border of the sternocleidomastoideus

Posteriorly: Anterior border of the trapezius

Inferiorly: Middle one third of the clavicle

Roof: Investing layer of the deep cervical fascia

Floor: (From superior to inferior)

1) M. semispinalis capitis

2) M. splenius capitis

3) M. levator scapulae

4) M. scalenus posterior

5) M. scalenus medius

Divisions
The posterior triangle is crossed, about 2.5 cm above the clavicle, by the inferior belly of the omohyoid muscle, which divides the space into two triangles:
 an upper or occipital triangle
 a lower or subclavian triangle (or supraclavicular triangle)

Contents
A) Nerves and plexuses:  
 Spinal accessory nerve (Cranial Nerve XI)
 Branches of cervical plexus
 Roots and trunks of brachial plexus
 Phrenic nerve (C3,4,5)

B) Vessels:
 Subclavian artery (Third part)
 Transverse cervical artery
 Suprascapular artery
 Terminal part of external jugular vein
C) Lymph nodes:
 Occipital
 Supraclavicular
D) Muscles:
 Inferior belly of omohyoid muscle
 Anterior Scalene
 Middle Scalene
 Posterior Scalene
 Levator Scapulae Muscle
 Splenius

Clinical significance
The accessory nerve (CN XI) is particularly vulnerable to damage during lymph node biopsy. Damage results in an inability to shrug the shoulders or raise the arm above the head, particularly due to compromised trapezius muscle innervation.

The external jugular vein's superficial location within the posterior triangle also makes it vulnerable to injury.

See also
Anterior triangle of the neck

References

External links
 
 
  - "Identification of the muscles associated with the posterolateral triangle."

Human head and neck
Triangles of the neck